Alpha Flight is a fictional team of Canadian superheroes appearing in American comic books published by Marvel Comics. The characters premiered in The Uncanny X-Men #120 (April 1979), and were created to serve as part of the X-Men member Wolverine's backstory. Marvel published an Alpha Flight comic book series from 1983 to 1994. The team serves as Canada's premier superhero team akin to America's Avengers.

Publication history 
Created by Canadian writer and artist John Byrne, the team first appeared in a two-part story in The Uncanny X-Men #120 and 121. Byrne never intended the team to be an ongoing title. He created them "merely to survive a fight with the X-Men" for the purposes of that story. Marvel convinced Byrne to feature them in their own series as a way to capitalize on Byrne's soaring popularity with comics fans at the time, but he never found them to have compelling stories or backgrounds and left the title after writing and pencilling the first 28 issues. The series continued until 1994, lasting 130 issues as well as annuals and miniseries. There have been three short-lived revivals since then, most recently an eight-issue limited series in 2011–12, after the resurrection of the team in the one shot comic Chaos War: Alpha Flight during the Chaos War event.

Most team members have distinctly Canadian attributes, such as having Inuit/First Nations or French heritage. Throughout most of its history, the team has worked for Department H, a fictional branch of Canada's Department of National Defence that deals with super-powered villains.

Fictional team biography

The Flight 
Alpha Flight was preceded by a team called "The Flight". This team first appeared in Alpha Flight Special vol. 2 #1 (1992).

Inspired by the debut of the Fantastic Four, James Hudson refined the purpose of Department H to find and/or develop Canada's superheroes. New recruit Groundhog joins Snowbird, St. Elmo, Stitch, Wolverine (as Weapon X) and Smart Alec in training. Within a week, the Flight is pressed into their first battle with Egghead's incarnation of the Emissaries of Evil (consisting of Rhino, Solarr, Eel, Porcupine, Power Man and Swordsman). Egghead threatens the United States from Canadian soil with a nuclear missile. Smart Alec disables the missile's guidance system, but Egghead triggers the detonation sequence. Smart Alec panics leading to St. Elmo transforming the missile and the bomb into light. St. Elmo succeeds, but loses himself in the process. Groundhog and Dr. Michael Twoyoungmen scold Hudson for sending the team into battle while so inexperienced, with a near psychotic leader (Weapon X) and someone who folds under pressure. Hudson thus makes plans for a tiered team system, leading to the formation of Alpha, Beta and Gamma Flight.

Pre-regular series 
Alpha Flight first appeared in The Uncanny X-Men #120 (April 1979), in which they are sent to follow up on Vindicator's first mission to retrieve Wolverine from the X-Men.

The initial makeup of Alpha Flight was drawn from all corners of Canada and included:

 Guardian: Originally Weapon Alpha, then Vindicator, James MacDonald Hudson is a scientist from London, Ontario who wears a suit of battle-armor, allowing him to fly and manipulate Earth's magnetic field. Guardian is the team's first leader, and wears a stylized Canadian maple leaf flag on his costume.
 Northstar: Jean-Paul Beaubier from Montreal, Quebec is a mutant with powers of super-speed and light generation.
 Aurora: Jeanne-Marie Beaubier is Northstar's twin sister who suffers from dissociative identity disorder (multiple personalities). Like her brother, she is also a mutant with powers of super-speed, flight, light generation, and molecular acceleration.
 Sasquatch: Walter Langowski is a scientist from Vancouver, British Columbia who can transform into a giant fur-covered beast resembling a Sasquatch. This character originally developed his powers from a Hulk-inspired gamma radiation experiment that was affected by a solar-flare. Eventually, it was explained that Sasquatch is actually a mystical monster.
 Shaman: Michael Twoyoungmen is a First Nations medicine man from Calgary, Alberta. He is both a skilled doctor and sorcerer.
 Snowbird: Also known as Narya, she is an Inuit demi-goddess from Yellowknife, Northwest Territories who can transform into animals of the north.

According to Byrne, both Guardian and Snowbird were "fan characters", created before he became professionally involved in comics, and he created all the remaining members while working on X-Men #120, specifically designing them to be balanced with the X-Men in power.

Volume 1 
The first Alpha Flight comic book series started in 1983 which ran until 1994.

Promoted from Beta Flight despite Department H being closed down by the Canadian government were:
 Marrina: An amphibious woman from Newfoundland, she was a former member of Beta Flight before joining Alpha Flight. She is actually part of an extraterrestrial invading force known as the Plodex.
 Puck: Eugene Judd is a dwarf bouncer from Saskatoon, Saskatchewan with enhanced strength and extraordinary acrobatic abilities.

Heather MacNeil is married to James Hudson. After Guardian's apparent death in Alpha Flight #12, she becomes the leader of the team. Later, she takes a replication of his costume and takes the codename of Vindicator then Guardian.

Alpha Flight continued for 130 issues, and introduced dozens of characters and villains (the most prominent of which were Talisman, Madison Jeffries, Box, Diamond Lil, Wild Child, Persuasion, and Witchfire).

Volume 2 
In 1997, Marvel relaunched the series with different characters. The new additions to the roster included:

 Flex: Adrian Corbo is a mutant with the ability to transform his limbs into sharp weapons. He is the half-brother of Radius.
 Manbot: Bernie Lechenay is a human/Box robot cyborg.
 Murmur: Arlette Truffaut is a young mutant from Quebec City, Quebec with powers of mind-control and teleportation.
 Radius: Jared Corbo is a mutant with the ability to create a force field.
 General Clarke: The sinister new director of Department H, responsible for many of the dark plots surrounding the team. Gains some measure of redemption with his sacrifice in issue #12.

Returning members were Vindicator (Heather Hudson, with a new costume and new geothermal powers), a de-aged Guardian (who turned out to be a clone of the original James Hudson, set at age 19), and Puck. Sunfire was also briefly a member while looking for a cure to a crippling illness.

The focus of this series was on Department H's consistently hidden agenda and Alpha Flight's reluctance to comply thereto. The conspiracy plotline saw Weapon X allowing an incarnation of the Zodiac Cartel to kidnap Madison Jeffries, who was subsequently brainwashed into becoming the group's "Gemini". To keep the group from interfering with their "deal", Department H brainwashed the team into forgetting Jeffries' kidnapping. Also, Department H employed an actual sasquatch as the new team's version of Sasquatch, without telling the team that it was not Walter Langkowski. Department H also arranged the kidnapping of Diamond Lil, another former Alpha Flight member and Madison Jeffries' wife, when she began to enquire about the location of her husband, with the intent of using her as a test subject for illegal medical experiments.

The series ended with issue #20 with most of the major storylines, such as the identity of the younger version of Guardian, unresolved, until Wolverine vol. 2 #142-143, when the plotline was resolved with the return of the real Guardian and the heroic sacrifice of the clone version.

Volume 3: "All-New, All-Different" Alpha Flight 
In 2004, Marvel started a new volume of Alpha Flight, with the "All-New, All-Different" prefix.

The new team recruited by Sasquatch includes:

 Centennial: Rutherford B. Princeton III is a 97-year-old man whose mutant powers of superhuman strength, invulnerability, flight, and heat vision manifested after being awakened from a coma by Sasquatch.
 Major Mapleleaf: Lou Sadler is the son of a World War II super-hero of the same name. He is secretly a normal human who rides a superpowered horse.
 Nemesis: Amelia Weatherly is both an adversary and ally of the old Alpha Flight. She has the power of flight and is skilled with a magical blade.
 Puck II: Zuzha Yu is the daughter of the original Puck. She has superhuman strength, speed, and agility.
 Yukon Jack: Also known as Yukotujakzurjimozoata, he is a mysterious man from a primitive tribe, bought from his father by Sasquatch.

"Waxing Poetic", the second six-issue story arc, sees the return of some original team members as both the original versions visited in the past, and temporal copies brought to the present. These members were Guardian, Vindicator, Puck, and Shaman.

Omega Flight 

Sasquatch, Guardian, Vindicator, Shaman, Major Mapleleaf II, and both Pucks are attacked by a new villain, the Collective (inhabiting the body of U.S. postal worker Michael Pointer), in New Avengers #16. Pointer continues on to the United States, leaving their bodies in the Yukon Territory.

The Alpha Flight title was relaunched as Omega Flight in April, 2007 as a five-issue mini-series. The new series was written by Michael Avon Oeming and drawn by Scott Kolins. The current roster includes Beta Ray Bill, U.S. Agent, Arachne, Talisman, and Michael Pointer in a suit that looks like Guardian's uniform. Sasquatch appears as the group's recruiter and leader. Since the mini-series, the team disbanded. Beta Ray Bill exited; U.S. Agent joined Hank Pym's new Avengers team; Pointer, now calling himself Omega, joined Norman Osborn's Dark X-Men; and Julia Carpenter became the new Madame Web.

"Chaos War" 

In the 2010 storyline the Chaos War, the four mainstay surviving members of Alpha Flight (Snowbird, Aurora, Northstar and Sasquatch) are reunited with Guardian, Vindicator, Shaman and Marrina Smallwood returning from the grave after Amatsu-Mikaboshi's victory in the death realms. The group bands together to fight the Great Beasts. Amatsu-Mikaboshi impales the Great Beasts. The resurrected members of Alpha Flight remain among the living after the defeat of Amatsu-Mikaboshi. At the same time, Puck appears in the "Wolverine Goes to Hell" storyline in Wolverine (2010), beginning in issue #2.

Volume 4 
In 2011, the team appeared in a series tied to the crossover storyline Fear Itself, with the newly alive team to be joined by Puck. Alpha Flight provides rescue efforts for the victims of a tsunami unleashed by Attuma in the form of Nerkodd: Breaker of Oceans. As Sasquatch, Shaman, and Vindicator help save victims of the water itself, Guardian saves a news crew when their helicopter is shot down by Nerkodd. As Marrina Smallwood and Aurora also arrive to help fight Nerkodd, the female reporter that Guardian saved comments to the television viewers on why Northstar isn't with the team.

After providing rescue efforts for victims of the disaster, Guardian ejects Nerkodd from the country by dumping him off the coast of Cape Race. Once Nerkodd is defeated and repelled, Alpha Flight returns to their headquarters and are betrayed by Gary Cody and his newly elected Unity Party. To make things worse, Vindicator has sided with him. It is shown that six weeks ago, Guardian and Vindicator were unable to regain custody of their child Claire. In the present, Marrina is dehydrated, Sasquatch's gamma energy is drained enough for him to revert to his human form of Walter Langkowski, and Aurora and Snowbird are taken down as well. While bringing Guardian to the Box Units for imprisonment, Vindicator is ambushed by Puck. After knocking out Vindicator, Puck tells Guardian that he had just returned to life after his fight with Ba'al.

At Parliament Hill, Walter is informed by Agent Jeff Brown that the concussions he had when he played football will cause him to act less human when he changes back into Sasquatch. Jeff also tells Walter that he will soon achieve Unity. Meanwhile, Marrina pretends to give in to the Unity treatment so that she can break free. Shaman manages to knock out Jeff and frees Walter, while Guardian frees Snowbird. Northstar and Puck manage to find Marrina, who has knocked out the guards and scientists present. After Alpha Flight escaped, they learned that Gary Cody and his Unity Party are a group of fascists. Northstar abducts a Department H operative and uses aerial torture in order to learn where Department H took Kyle Jinadu.

After reclaiming her daughter Claire from her cousin, Vindicator assembles Alpha Strike (consisting of Persuasion, Ranark, a Wendigo, and a brainwashed Citadel) in order to spread the Unity program and take down Alpha Flight. It is soon discovered that Master of the World is behind the Unity Party, the formation of Alpha Strike and what has happened to Department H as he introduces himself to Kyle Jinadu. Alpha Flight ends up robbing a treasury in order to fund a special tactical training from Taskmaster in an isolated Yukon Territory.

While overseeing the formation of a revolution against the Unity Party, Guardian, Sasquatch, and Shaman hatch a desperate and dangerous plan that involves the bad personality of Aurora. Aurora's personality begins to cause her to become unstable to herself and Alpha Flight. Meanwhile, Master of the World explains his history involving the Plodex to Claire. Alpha Flight manages to rescue Kyle Jinadu and encounter Wolverine.

At a beach in Ontario with Claire, Vindicator is visited by Wolverine who states that the people in the United States are becoming concerned about the Unity Party's actions. When Wolverine notices that Vindicator calls the rest of Alpha Flight traitors, Wolverine decides to investigate. Wolverine finds Alpha Flight and learns of their revolution against the Unity Party. He agrees to help them take back Canada just as Alpha Strike attacks.

During the ensuing fight, Alpha Flight managed to capture Persuasion as she is a component for a cure that would be used against the Unity Process. Alpha Flight, Wolverine, and Taskmaster are then prepared to take Canada back as Master of the World comes out of hiding. Master of the World begins his attack on Parliament Hill with Agent Jeff Brown and Claire Hudson present in his spaceship. He even manages to kill Gary Cody, his purpose served. Guardian continues to fight Vindicator as she orders the rest of Alpha Strike to free Persuasion and destroy the machine connected to her.

Alpha Flight defeats Alpha Strike. Vindicator (still under of Master of the World's mental control) helps Alpha Flight against Master of the World when he attempts to kill Claire. Alpha Flight successfully creates the machine to free the people that Master of the World had under his mental control. They kill Master of the World, but Vindicator flies away with Claire. Afterward, Alpha Flight celebrates after the Unity Party is abolished.

Alpha Flight later aids Red Hulk when the Mayan Gods appear on Earth. The battle results with Aurora, Sasquatch, and Snowbird in a coma, but they recover.

Space program version 
A different version of Alpha Flight debuted as part of the All-New, All-Different Marvel event. This version is a space program that becomes Earth's line of defense from extraterrestrial threats and resides in the Alpha Flight Low-Orbit Space Station. Its members include Captain Marvel, Abigail Brand, Aurora, Puck and Sasquatch. The first wing of the Triskelion is where the ground crew of the Alpha Flight space program resides.

Black Panther also sent a group of Alpha Flight explorers to search for the origin of the Mena Ngai. While exploring the Vega System, the explorers' travels took them through a temporal anomaly into the past, where they established over the next two-thousand years the Intergalactic Empire of Wakanda, named after their homeland.<ref>Black Panther vol. 7 #12</ref>

During the "Civil War II" storyline, it is revealed that the Alpha Flight Space Program is overseen by its Board of Governors which consists of representatives of the different nations of Earth and other planets that share the Alpha Flight Space Program's interests. Known members of the Alpha Flight Space Program's Board of Governors are Black Panther of Wakanda, Henry Peter Gyrich of the United States, Philippe Beaulieu of Canada (revealed to be a revived Master of the World in disguise), Mentor of the Shi'ar, Bar-Konn of the Kree, an unnamed Rigellian ambassador, and an unnamed Kronan ambassador.

During the "Secret Empire" crossover, Alpha Flight assisted Captain Marvel with protecting Earth from a Chitauri invasion, but were trapped in space once Captain America activated a force field around Earth.

In order to track down Hulk after he escaped from General Reginald Fortean's custody, a depowered Walter Langkowski started the space program's version of Gamma Flight.

Return of the original team
The original lineup of Alpha Flight would be revived as Canada's top superhero team once more in their post-space program years, consisting of Guardian, Aurora, Northstar, Snowbird, Sasquatch, Puck and Marrina.

 Notable villains 
Alpha Flight has fought many criminals and malevolent entities. Many were unique to them as they were based in Canada. Notable examples include:

 Bedlam
 Caliber
 Citadel
 Deadly Ernest
 The Derangers
 Dreamqueen
 Gilded Lily
 Great Beasts – The Great Beasts were created by John Byrne and served as antagonists throughout the first 24 issues of his run on Alpha Flight. During the Chaos War storyline, Sasquatch gives Tundra, Kariooq, Ranaq, Somon, Kolomaq, and Tolomaq access to Earth so they can kill Amatusu-Mikaboshi. Neooqtoq is described as the "deadliest" of the Great Beasts. Although the beast itself does not appear, Snowbird assumes its form to battle the slave gods of the Skrulls. After Snowbird freezes them, the Great Beasts are impaled by Mikaboshi's tendrils and presumably killed.
 Kariooq, The Corruptor – Kariooq appears in Alpha Flight #24. He resembles a giant rotting corpse with green skin, similar to the Inhumanoid named D'Compose. (The two were created around the same time period). Kariooq as a character is never "fleshed out" other than his weakness to ice ("the preserver") and his enmity with Tundra as a rival. It can be assumed however that his power might be that of decay and corruption or even control of the dead.
 Kolomaq, The Beast of the Snows – Kolomaq appears in Alpha Flight #6. He appears during oil drilling in an unrevealed location of Canada. His appearance destroys the oil well and catches the attention of the Inuit demigod Snowbird. Kolomaq possesses energy welding powers but his main ability is to create blinding snowstorms. Seven pages of Alpha Flight issue 6 are white panels captioned with dialogue and narration. Kolomaq is described as the most ferocious of the Beasts and enemy to Tundra the Land Beast. He is also capable of conjuring sharp icicles. Snowbird tricks Kolomaq into triggering a landslide which either kills or imprisons him. Kolomaq appears as a white Yeti-like creature with an angry totem mask as a face.
 Neooqtoq the Ravager – Called the deadliest of the Great Beasts, Snow Bird assumed its form during the Secret Invasion to battle off the Skrull Gods army of enslaved alien gods. It resembles giant brittle star whose arms are covered with fanged maws.
 Ranaq, The Devourer – Ranaq appears in Alpha Flight #18 but his origin is expanded upon in issue 19. Ranaq appears as a floating shape of blob-like energy or corrupted flesh marked by evil red eyes and grotesquely large yellow teeth. He is summoned by a shaman in 19th-century Calgary, the summoning forced by fortune-seeker Zebediah "Zeb" Chase and his young cohort Lucas Strang. The two hold the shaman's granddaughter hostage and force the shaman to summon the Devourer. Zeb and Lucas use magical talismans to protect themselves from Ranaq but these same talismans prevent them from touching the treasure and prostitutes that they force Ranaq to conjure. It is unrevealed as to whether these treasures and women are real or merely illusions. When Zeb removes his talisman to embrace a prostitute, the woman's face turns into a gigantic maw that consumes Zeb, allowing Ranaq to possess the man. According to the shaman, this need for a human body makes Ranaq the weakest of the Great Beasts. Lucas Strang turns his talisman into a magic bullet and kills Ranaq in mortal form; he is cursed with a 100-year lifespan until Ranaq's soul is released after Zeb Chase's grave is disturbed in the year 1985. Ranaq is able to use a form of energy to attack his opponents which he does on two occasions Alpha Flight #18. His attacks can be thwarted by charms or spells that inhibit magic. It would appear that Ranaq needs to inhabit a human body in order to interact on earth, however, this has not been verified.
 Somon, The Great Artificer – Somon appears in Alpha Flight #24. He is an old looking humanoid depicted with long arms and a bull-horn headdress. He uses a powerful staff as a weapon and can control the other Great Beasts. The very land where the Great Beasts dwell responds to Somon's control. He is also capable of some sort of astral projection that allows him to kill by stabbing his victims with his astral fingernails. Somon is the most intelligent of the Great Beasts, known for his malevolent trickery. He, like Ranaq, is physically weak despite his great magical power. Snowbird mortally wounds him but he returns in perfect health at later dates.
 Tanaraq – Tanaraq appears in The Uncanny X-Men #120 as the superhero Sasquatch but his origin is expanded upon in Alpha Flight #23. He is comparable to Sasquatch at his original sasquatch form but with white fur. When Dr. Walter Langkowski bombarded himself with gamma radiation, the experiment did not go as planned, as he had unleashed for a fraction of time enough physical energy to break the mystical barrier that held the Great Beasts in their prison. A mystical symbiosis was formed between Walter and Tanaraq, which didn't allowed Walter to transform into Sasquatch, like everyone thought, but to summon Tanaraq and control him. Whenever Walter turned into his Sasquatch form, he was actually trading places with Tanaraq. Eventually, Tanaraq was able to take control of his body in this realm. Snowbird realized this and attacked Tanaraq, slaying him, stranding Walter's soul in the Realm of the Beasts forever. He is also the responsible for the Wendigo Curse and acts as the "father" of the Wendigo. Tanaraq has demonstrated superhuman strength and resistance to injury as demonstrated when Langkowski assumes his form. Back in 1,000 AD, Tanaraq was revealed to be a member of the 11th Century's version of the Avengers alongside Thor, Boldof the Black, Nehanda, Chief Hellhawk, and an unnamed Atlantean who wielded the Iron Fist.King Thor #4. Marvel Comics.
 Tolomaq, The Fire Beast – A minor Great Beast, Tolomaq first appears in Alpha Flight #24. His character is never fully developed. He appears as a shapeless column of fire.
 Tundra, The Land Beast – First appearing in Alpha Flight #1, Tundra is the first of the Great Beasts that Alpha Flight confronts. Tundra is summoned through a mystic ritual in which a vagabond (who is actually the father of Snowbird) traces a gigantic human shape in the barren land of Canada's Northwest Territories and then dons a metallic crown that summons the spirit of Tundra. The vagabond's corpse animates, the land mimicking the corpses movement until Tundra rises in the shape of a humanoid mass of earth. According to Shaman, Tundra is supposed to be controlled by the mind of the human who summons him but because of the weakness of the vagabond summoning Tundra, Tundra's real personality quickly takes over. Tundra's powers stem from the land itself. He can summon mosquitoes, hurl boulders from his body, increase his size by absorbing land mass, and is connected to the land so if he is injured, earthquake-style upheavals occur in the surrounding area. He was defeated by natural erosion after Northstar and Aurora created a whirlwind around him using their superhuman speed and Marrina created a water spout that Shaman uses to create a torrential downpour. Tundra is arch-enemy to the Great Beast Kariooq, the Corruptor.
 Jerry Jaxon and his Omega Flight
 Master of the World
 Pestilence
 Pink Pearl
 The Plodex
 Ranark
 Wendigo
 The Collector

 Other versions 
 Ultimate Marvel 
In the Ultimate Marvel reality, Alpha Flight debuted in Ultimate X-Men #94 with Vindicator (formally Col. John Wraith of Weapon X), Shaman, Jubilee, Sunfire, Sasquatch, Snowbird and Aurora. The team ambushes the X-Men in the middle of a friendly baseball game. All of its members appear to use godlike powers; they easily defeat the X-Men and kidnap NorthStar. It is later revealed by Wolverine, who apparently has a history with them, that they used a drug called Banshee to enhance their abilities, making them more powerful than normal mutants. Vindicator claims that Alpha Flight is the first internationally sanctioned mutant team made powerful enough to take on any "considerable" threats such as the Liberators, the Brotherhood, and the Ultimates, as Vindicator sees the latter as loyal only to America and Alpha Flight to the world. They are defeated by Colossus's team of X-Men, who were also being powered by Banshee.

 Marvel Adventures 
In issue #11 of Marvel Adventures Iron Man, Tony Stark travels to Nunavut to try to find his father Howard. As he is flying through a series of mountains, he is attacked by Alpha Flight after Northstar and Aurora mistake him for a training robot built by Guardian. After the real drone appears, Sasquatch and Guardian make some hasty apologies before Iron Man continues on his mission. Later in the issue, Alpha Flight aids Iron Man in a battle against the Living Laser.

 Marvel Zombies 
A zombified version of Alpha Flight (consisting of Guardian, Northstar, Aurora, Sasquatch, Puck, and Snowbird) appeared in the first issue of Marvel Zombies: Dead Days, attacking the X-Men at the Xavier Institute for Gifted Youngsters, and killing Professor X in the process. They are later killed by Magneto, who uses his powers to make various metallic objects pierce their brains.

 Old Man Logan 
In Old Man Logan vol. 2 #17, Logan is shown a vision of the dead Alpha Flight (consisting of Guardian, Northstar, Aurora, Sasquatch, Puck and Snowbird) by a young Jean Grey.

 What If? 
Alpha Flight was featured in the different "What If?" stories:

 In "What If The All-New All-Different X-Men Had Never Existed," Wolverine is shown to be the leader of Alpha Flight when they are loaned to the Japanese government who needed help dealing with Moses Magnum when the Japanese government was unable to reach the Avengers. Both Alpha Flight and the X-Men defeated Moses Magnum.
 In "What If Wolverine Was Leader Of Alpha Flight?", the team succeeded in capturing Logan after their fight with the X-Men. In this reality, Logan did not escape from Canadian custody and slip aboard the X-Men's plane. The team chose to turn back around and mount a rescue. The military called Department H to get them to talk the X-Men out of it before the military handled it. Northstar was on monitor duty and chose not to respond. The military then shot the X-Men down- none of them survived the crash. Hudson told Logan face to face with nobody between them, half expecting Logan to kill him. Instead, he told Hudson that since his new family was dead, he had nothing left but to stay with Alpha Flight. He immediately led a mission into the Negative Zone to rescue their Beta and Gamma Flight trainees Puck, Marrina, Smart Alec, Wild Child, Flashback and Box, who had been kidnapped by Annihilus during an experiment by Department H scientists to open doorways to other dimensions. Hudson couldn't lead the rescue mission as Vindicator- he had to stay behind and operate the machinery that controlled the Negative Zone gateway. Wolverine led Shaman, Northstar, Aurora, Sasquatch and Snowbird in, and not only rescued their people, but negotiated peace with Annihilus. He taught Wild Child to control his savagery and got the team to bond better than Hudson ever could, but Northstar was always nervous around Wolverine because of what he did. Hudson knew what would happen if Logan ever learned about Northstar's role in the X-Men's deaths. Their worst fear happened when Professor X and the surviving X-Men (Iceman, Havok, Polaris, Angel) called for help. The Hellfire Club had captured them all and transformed Jean Gray into Dark Phoenix. Alpha Flight rescued them, but Dark Phoenix telepathically showed Wolverine what Northstar did. She tried to get him to kill Northstar, but he killed her instead to free her from the curse of Dark Phoenix. Hudson expected Logan to quit the team, but Logan surprised him by forgiving Northstar and agreeing to stay on as leader of Alpha Flight.
 In "What if... Wolverine had battled Weapon X?", the Flight members were in the middle of their training when Guy Desjardins (Weapon X) breaks free after the eponymous program left Desjardins in the hands of Department H.

 Collected editions 

 In other media 
 Television 
Alpha Flight appeared in the X-Men, consisting of Vindicator, Puck, Snowbird, Shaman, Northstar, Aurora, Sasquatch, and Dr. Heather Hudson.

 Music 
 The band Courage My Love featured various issues of Alpha Flight in their YouTube video of their song "I Sell Comics".
 San Diego based band Manual Scan's 1997 album, "Plan of Action" includes a full page 1984 vintage photo of frontman Bart Mendoza reading Alpha Flight #6 
 Chicago-based band The Kickback released a song called "Alpha Flight" on their Mea Culpa Mea Culpa EP.
 Brampton-based Canadian band The Vulcan Dub Squad released a song called "Alpha Flight #12" on their 2005 album Just Watch Us''.

See also 
 List of Flight members
 Beta Flight
 Gamma Flight
 Omega Flight

References

External links 
 Alpha Flight at the Marvel Universe
 AlphaFlight.net
 Alpha Flight (Team) at Comic Vine
 

 
Comics characters introduced in 1979
Characters created by John Byrne (comics)
Characters created by Chris Claremont
Canadian superheroes
Canadian-themed superheroes
Marvel Comics superhero teams
X-Men supporting characters